Hesketh Raoul Lejarderay Millais (1901–1999), usually known as Raoul or 'Liony' Millais was a portrait painter, equestrian artist and sportsman. He was the grandson of Sir John Everett Millais and the son of John Guille Millais and from them he inherited both his artistic talent and his love of animals and of hunting.

His father was an artist, soldier, naturalist, hunter, writer and explorer. Raoul followed his father in each of these roles. He is best known for his equestrian paintings and for his Spanish work, created when he accompanied Ernest Hemingway. Like his contemporary, Alfred Munnings, Millais was an opponent of Modernism in art, which he called "the Picasso lark".

He died in 1999 in his 99th year in Oxfordshire, England

He married Elinor Clare  (d. 1953), daughter of late Allan Ronald Macdonell, of Montreal, and had two sons, John and Hugh. 
He married secondly Kay Prior Palmer with whom he had a third son, Hesketh Merlin.

References

Biography
Duff Hart-Davis, Raoul Millais: his life and work (1998)

External links
 http://findarticles.com/p/articles/mi_qn4158/is_19991123/ai_n14263901

1901 births
1999 deaths
People from Horsham
20th-century English painters
English male painters
British Realist painters
Equine artists
English portrait painters
English hunters
English explorers
20th-century English male artists